The women's 80 metres hurdles hurdling event at the 1960 Olympic Games took place between August 31 and September 1.

Results

Heats

The top two runners in each of the six heats advanced to the  semifinal round.

Heat 1

Heat 2

Heat 3

Heat 4

Heat 5

Heat 6

Semifinal
The top three runners in each of the two heats advanced to the final round.

Heat 1

Heat 2

Final
Wind = 0.0 m/s.

Key: OR = Olympic record

References

Athletics at the 1960 Summer Olympics
Sprint hurdles at the Olympics
1960 in women's athletics
Women's events at the 1960 Summer Olympics